Myanmar participated at the 16th Asian Games in Guangzhou, China.

Medalists

Aquatics

Archery

Athletics

Cue Sports

Dragon boat

Sepaktakraw

Shooting

Volleyball

Weightlifting

Wushu

Nations at the 2010 Asian Games
2010
Asian Games